Joan Stiebel MBE (23 April 1911 – 25 January 2007) was a Jewish relief worker in London, England, after World War II.  

Joan Valentine Stiebel was born on 23 April 1911 in Walton-on-Thames, Surrey, England.  The daughter of Christian parents, Ernest Arthur Stiebel and Valentine Evelyn Mary Amelia Pender, she became increasingly active in Jewish affairs after becoming a secretary to Otto M. Schiff, CBE, in 1933. In 1939, after Schiff and others had formed what today is called the World Jewish Relief organization, Stiebel was appointed to that organization full-time.

After the end of World War II, Stiebel was responsible for making travel arrangements to bring 1,000 underaged Jewish Nazi concentration camp orphans to the United Kingdom.  The children came to be known in the press as the Boys, and her involvement with them continued throughout her lifetime.

She was also instrumental in the formation of Jewish Child's Day in 1947.

In 1958 she was appointed as the United Kingdom-based Joint Secretary of the World Jewish Relief organization.  

She was awarded the Member of the Order of  the British Empire in 1978 for her lifetime of service to Jewish refugees. 

Shortly after retiring from the World Jewish Relief organization in 1979, she was recruited by The Wiener Library to assist in establishing their Endowment Fund.  She continued this pro bono work until her permanent retirement in 1989.

Stiebel died in London, England on 25 January 2007. In May 2019, the British Government honoured Stiebel with the British Hero of the Holocaust award.

References

External links
World Jewish Relief Website
Jewish Child's Day Charity Website
The Wiener Library Website

1911 births
2007 deaths
English Jews
People from Walton-on-Thames
Members of the Order of the British Empire